Grimmy may refer to:
Mother Goose and Grimm, an American comic strip
Mother Goose and Grimm (TV series), American animated television series based on the comic strip
Nick Grimshaw, often known as Grimmy, a British television and radio presenter
The Grim Reaper, the personification of death